The following is a list of psychedelic folk artists.

Artists

The Accidental
Akron/Family
Animal Collective
Arborea
August Born
Bread, Love and Dreams
Vashti Bunyan
Nick Castro
Circulus
Circus Maximus
Comus
Current 93
Buck Curran
Richard Dawson
Alela Diane
Donovan
Dr. Strangely Strange
Espers
Simon Finn
Mark Fry
Globelamp
Mattias Hellberg & the White Moose
Heron Oblivion
Robyn Hitchcock
The Holy Modal Rounders
The Incredible String Band
Jan Dukes de Grey
Lavender Diamond
Midlake
Nagisa ni te
Natural Snow Buildings
Pacific Gold
Pearls Before Swine
Linda Perhacs
Sexwitch
Six Organs of Admittance
Sleepy Sun
Snowglobe
Stealing Sheep
Meic Stevens
Summer Hymns
Trembling Bells
T. Rex (as Tyrannosaurus Rex)
The Valerie Project
Waves
Dusty Wright

See also
List of psychedelic pop artists
List of psychedelic rock artists

References

Bibliography

 List
Psychedelic folk